Najbolje pesme 1980–1988 is the first greatest hits compilation by the Serbian rock band Električni Orgazam. The compilation was rereleased in the 1990s by Hi-Fi Centar and Yellow Dog Records.

Track listing 
All tracks by S. Gojković, except where noted.
 "Zlatni papagaj" (2:10)
 "Krokodili dolaze" (S. Gojković, Lj. Đukić) (3:10)
 "Konobar" (Đukić) (2:12)
 "Nebo" (4:38)
 "Odelo" (2:01)
 "Dokolica" (2:29)
 "Locomotion" (C. King, G. Goffin) (3:23)
 "Skamenjen" (5:14)
 "Vudu bluz" (2:58)
 "Debela devojka" (2:41)
 "Ja sam težak kao konj" (2:36)
 "Ne postojim" (2:26)
 "Kapetan Esid" (3:50)
 "Kako bubanj kaže" (4:17)
 "Bejbe, ti nisi tu (M. Jagger, K. Richards) (3:47)
 "Igra rokenrol cela Jugoslavija" (4:11)

Notes 
 Tracks 1,2 - from Paket aranžman (1981)
 Tracks 3,4 - from Električni orgazam (1981)
 Tracks 5,6 - from Lišće prekriva Lisabon (1982)
 Track 7 - from Les Chansones Populaires (1983)
 Track 8 - from Kako bubanj kaže (1984)
 Tracks 9-13 - from Distorzija (1986)
 Tracks 14,15 - from Braćo i sestre (1987)
 Track 16 - from Letim, sanjam, dišem (1988)

References 
 Električni Orgazam discography at Diskografije.com
 Najbolje pesme 1980-1988 at Discogs

1988 compilation albums
Hi-Fi Centar compilation albums
Jugoton compilation albums
Električni Orgazam compilation albums